Spencer Gore defeated William Marshall, 6–1, 6–2, 6–4 in the final to win the inaugural Gentlemen's Singles tennis title at the 1877 Wimbledon Championships.

Draw

Finals

Earlier rounds

Section 1

Section 2

Section 3

References

External links

Singles
Wimbledon Championship by year – Men's singles